The Associate Reformed Presbyterian Church in the USA began to send missionaries to Mexico.

History 
In the late 1870s a presbytery was formed. The official beginning of the denomination is in 1879. The church is active in the Northeastern part of Mexico and in the capital city and Guadalajara.
The church is now completely independent from the Associate Reformed Church USA.
The denomination has more than 30,000 members in more than 60 churches. Currently there are 4 presbyteries, the Tamaulipas Presbytery. the Veracruz, San Luis Potosí and Las Huastecas Presbyteries.

Doctrine 
The church recognise the historic Presbyterian confessions:
Westminster Confession of Faith
Westminster Shorter Catechism
Westminster Larger Catechism
Canons of Dort
Apostle Creed
Nicene Creed

Interchurch organisations 
The Associate Reformed Presbyterian Church in Mexico is a member church of the World Communion of Reformed Churches.

External links
Official website

References 

 www.reformiert-online.net

Associate Reformed Presbyterian Church
Christian organizations established in the 1870s
Churches in Mexico
Evangelical denominations in North America
Members of the World Communion of Reformed Churches
Presbyterian denominations in Mexico